Wishenpoof! is an animated streaming television series which aired for two seasons, from February 5, 2014 to May 9, 2019. The series was created by Angela Santomero and stars Addison Holley as Bianca, a young fairy girl who grants children's wishes.

Characters
Bartholomew, a teddy from the Enchanted Forest
Beatrice, a teddy from the Enchanted Forest
Ben, Bianca's younger brother
Betty, a teddy from the Enchanted Forest
Bianca, a brown-haired, blue-eyed, six-year-old girl, who has wish magic and solves problems in addition to helping other characters throughout the series
Bianca's dad
Bianca's fairy grandmother, who has wish magic
Bianca's mom, who has wish magic
Bob, Bianca's teddy bear and "best friend" from the Enchanted Forest
Bouncer, a teddy from the Enchanted Forest
Bruno, an ogre who is friends with Bianca's fairy grandmother
Charlie, one of Bianca's friends/schoolmates
Frank, one of Bianca's friends she plays with at the willow tree (Frank also has wish magic)
Froovle, Frank's pet
Laurel, one of Bianca's friends she plays with at the willow tree (Laurel also has wish magic)
Lola, a pink teddy from the Enchanted Forest
Miss Bridget, Bianca's schoolteacher
Oliver, one of Bianca's friends/schoolmates
Penelope, one of Bianca's friends/schoolmates
Pickles, Penelope's toy, purple horse (not magically alive, at least in season 1)
Piggie, Ben's stuffed pig
Violet, one of Bianca's friends/schoolmates

Voices
Addison Holley – Bianca (speaking voice)
Hope Cassandra – Bianca (singing voice)
Rhodé Algra - Bianca (opening theme voice)
Scott McCord – Bob
Alyson Court – Bianca's mom (pilot)
Katie Griffin – Bianca's mom (series) and Betty
Jason Priestley – Bianca's dad
Kaelyn Breitkopf – Ben
Johnny Orlando - Oliver
Aaron Feigenbaum – Charlie
Adrian David Lloyd – Frank
Allison Augustin – Penelope (pilot)
Ava Priestly – Laurel
Carrie Adelstein – Lola
Devan Cohen – Charlie
Jeff Geddis – Bouncer
John Davis – Froovle
Kathleen Laskey – Bianca's fairy grandma
Kristin Fairlie – Beatrice
Matthew MacFadzean – Bruno and Bartholomew
Millie Davis – Penelope
Emma Davis – Miss Bridget
Saara Chaudry – Violet

Episodes

Season 1 (2014–2015)

Season 2 (2017–2019)

References

External links
 
 

2010s American animated television series
2014 American television series debuts
2019 American television series endings
2010s Canadian animated television series
2014 Canadian television series debuts
2019 Canadian television series endings
American children's animated fantasy television series
American computer-animated television series
American preschool education television series
Canadian children's animated fantasy television series
Canadian computer-animated television series
Canadian preschool education television series
Amazon Prime Video original programming
English-language television shows
Television series by DHX Media
Television series created by Angela Santomero
Television series by Amazon Studios
Animated television series by Amazon Studios
Amazon Prime Video children's programming
Television series by 9 Story Media Group
Animated television series about children
Animated preschool education television series
2010s preschool education television series